Žeravice is a village in the municipalities of Han Pijesak (Republika Srpska) and Olovo, Bosnia and Herzegovina.

After the Dayton Agreement, a large part of the village was ceded to the Federation of Bosnia and Herzegovina and organized into the Olovo municipality.

Demographics 
According to the 2013 census, its population was nil. According to the 1991 census, there were 216 inhabitants, 214 of whom were Serbs living in the Han Pijesak part with also none at the time in the Olovo part.

References

Populated places in Han Pijesak
Populated places in Olovo